"Baby, Baby Don't Cry", released in December 1968, is a single recorded by The Miracles for Motown Records' Tamla label. The composition was written by Miracles lead singer Smokey Robinson, Motown staff writers Al Cleveland and Terry Johnson, a former member of The Flamingos. Robinson, Johnson, and Miracles member Warren "Pete" Moore were the song's producers.

Background
The song is noted for Smokey's spoken recitation at the beginning as well as before the second verse. The spoken lines are:  "Nothing so blue as a heart in pain/Nothing so sad as a tear in vain", and "You trusted him and gave him your love/A love he proved unworthy of". The song uses an extended bridge that repeats the minor and diminished chords before going up half a step for the final repeated Choruses.

Although not given writing credit on this particular tune, Miracle Marv Tarplin's outstanding guitar work plays an important role in this song, his gentle but effective riffs being evident from the song's beginning, giving a "raindrop" effect reminiscent of someone crying (the song's main theme).

The Miracles performed this song on a 1969 telecast of The Mike Douglas Show, a performance that was re-broadcast many years later on VH-1. The success of this song ended a period of relatively mediocre chart action for The Miracles during 1968, and set the stage for their biggest hit ever with Smokey as lead singer, 1970's multi-million selling #1 hit "The Tears of a Clown".

Personnel: The Miracles
Smokey Robinson - lead vocals
Claudette Rogers Robinson - background vocals
Pete Moore - background vocals
Ronnie White - background vocals
Bobby Rogers - background vocals
Marv Tarplin - guitar

Other Credits
The Funk Brothers - instrumentation

Chart performance
"Baby Baby Don't Cry" was a top 10 pop hit for The Miracles, peaking at number eight on the Billboard Hot 100 in the United States, and at a Top 10 R&B hit as well, peaking as number three on Billboard's R&B singles chart. It sold over one million copies,

Cover versions
Gerald Wilson and His Orchestra
Projekt

References

External links
  See The MIRACLES Perform Baby Baby Don't Cry on YouTube''
 Baby Baby Don't Cry - by The Miracles - A Review by Joel Francis

The Miracles songs
Songs written by Smokey Robinson
Tamla Records singles
1968 songs
1969 singles
Songs written by Terry "Buzzy" Johnson
Songs written by Al Cleveland
Song recordings produced by Smokey Robinson